Coleophora izenella is a moth of the family Coleophoridae.

The larvae feed on Kochia prostrata. They feed on the generative organs of their host plant.

References

izenella
Moths described in 1989